Firepot may refer to

 A method of cooking, as in Steamboat (food)
 A device for carrying fire